Cinereach is a nonprofit film funding organization in New York, NY, founded in 2006, which provides grants, awards, an annual fellowship, and in-house film production.  The organization also has partnerships with other film development organizations such as the Sundance Institute and other film funding organizations.

In 2009, Cinereach funded $1.5 million of Sundance Film Festival grants over three years. The funding supports a minimum of twelve feature and documentary films developed at Sundance. In June 2011, four grants each were given for post-production and development for feature films, and for documentaries, one development and two production grants were made.

The organization provides direct annual grants to fund development, production, and post-production in documentary and feature film categories.

Films supported by Cinereach in the past include: Return, Donor Unknown, The Forgiveness of Blood, Pariah, Entre nos, Bully, The Boy Mir, Kinyarwanda, and Circumstance. Cinereach's 2018 grantees include Akicita: The Battle of Standing Rock, Black Mother, Chained for Life, Hale County This Morning, This Evening, Matangi/Maya/M.I.A., Monsters and Men, Night Comes On, Phantom Cowboys, Shirkers, Sorry to Bother You, This is Congo, and Wild Nights with Emily.   

Recipients of the Cinereach Producers Initiative award have included Karin Chien, Julie Goldman, Lars Knudsen, Heather Rae, Joslyn Barnes, Shrihari Sathe and Jay van Hoy.

Cinereach rebranded in 2009 with a new identity and website design by experience design firm Method.

References

External links

Non-profit organizations based in New York City
Film organizations in the United States
Arts organizations established in 2006